Hancavičy Regional House of Crafts — was established in 1997 to study, revive and develop folk crafts.

History 
House of Crafts works since 1997 and groups artisans of Hancavičy district who work in the field of traditional crafts.

Aims and functions

Aims 
 to support and create conditions for natural existence and revival of local folk craft traditions;
 competent collection, storage, classification and systematisation of traditional crafts of Hancavičy district.

Activities 
Research work: expeditions around the district to gather materials about crafts and their current state.

Methodical fund: the House of Crafts provides methodical and practical help to rural culture institutions in organization and conducting of workshops in arts and crafts, collects and classifies materials on the modern types of arts and crafts, informs leaders of study groups, cultural workers and all interested parties.

Weaving, embroidery and belt weaving groups work under the House of Crafts.

Collection 
A rich collection of traditional ručnik and items of local clothes has been gathered in the House of Crafts since its foundation. The collection of woven ručnik numbers nearly 50 items.

Awards 
 Special award of the President of the Belarus for workers of culture and arts for revival and preservation of folk crafts and awaking youth's interest to traditional culture (2011) 
 І place of VI Republican Fair-Festival of Crafts "Viasnovy Bukiet" (2014) 
 І place of VII Republican Fair-Festival of Crafts "Viasnovy Bukiet" (2015)

Participation in celebrations, fairs and festivals 
 International Art Festival "Slavianski Bazar" (Viciebsk, 2008)
 Republican Day of Belarusian Literature (Hancavičy, 2011)

References

External links 
 House of Crafts (Hancavičy) on the web-page of the Department of ideological work, culture and youth affairs of Hancavičy district executive committee
 House of Crafts (Hancavičy) on VK
 House of Crafts (Hancavičy) on Facebook

Belarusian culture
Belarusian folklore
Belarusian clothing
Education in Belarus
Educational organizations based in Belarus
Brest Region